Manuel Jesús Vázquez Florido (born 25 January 1991), known as Chuli, is a Spanish professional footballer who plays for Lleida Esportiu as a striker.

He spent most of his career in the Segunda División, totalling 163 games and 39 goals for seven clubs, mainly Recreativo and Almería. He also played 11 La Liga matches for Betis.

Club career

Recreativo
Born in Huelva, Andalusia, Chuli spent his first year as a senior with RCD Espanyol's B team, appearing sparingly and suffering relegation from Segunda División B. On 22 January 2011 he scored his first goal as a senior, in a 4–0 home win over CF Amposta in the Tercera División. He signed for Recreativo de Huelva that summer, initially being assigned to the reserves also in the fourth division; he first played officially with the main squad on 16 May 2012, against Córdoba CF.

Chuli was promoted to the first team in 2012–13 after scoring 22 goals with the B's the previous season, featuring in the first game of the campaign against Xerez CD. On 8 September, he netted twice and won a penalty in the 3–2 home victory over Real Murcia.

Chuli continued with his form on 6 October 2012, scoring a hat-trick in a 4–2 home defeat of AD Alcorcón; one of the goals was Recreativo's 1,500th in the Segunda División. He finished the season with 15 goals (in the league and overall), helping the oldest club in Spain easily avoid relegation.

Betis
On 8 May 2013, Chuli joined neighbouring Real Betis on a four-year contract, for a fee of €600,000. He made his La Liga debut on 25 August by playing roughly 30 minutes in a 1–2 home loss against RC Celta de Vigo, and scored his first goal for his new club on 7 November, again coming as a second-half substitute in a 1–0 victory at Vitória S.C. in the group stage of the UEFA Europa League.

On 1 September 2014, Chuli was supposed to move on loan to Real Zaragoza in a season-long deal, but nothing came of it. On 7 January 2015, he was loaned to CD Leganés until June.

Almería
On 9 July 2015, Chuli signed a five-year deal with UD Almería, recently relegated from the top flight. The following 31 January, he scored a brace in a 2–1 home defeat of Zaragoza.

Getafe
Chuli joined Getafe CF on loan on 31 January 2017, with Karim Yoda moving in the opposite direction. After contributing five goals (including a brace in a 4–0 home win over his former club Almería) as his side achieved top-tier promotion, he agreed to a permanent contract.

On 12 December 2017, after making no league appearances during the campaign, Chuli was loaned to second-division CD Lugo until the following 30 June. The following 14 August, he moved to fellow league team Extremadura UD also in a temporary deal.

Later career
On 28 August 2019, Chuli returned to his hometown team of Recreativo de Huelva in the third tier. Despite arriving at a team tipped for promotion, they suffered a double relegation to the fifth division due to league restructuring in May 2021.

Chuli signed for Hércules CF of the new Segunda División RFEF in September 2021.

Career statistics

Club

References

External links

1991 births
Living people
Spanish footballers
Footballers from Huelva
Association football forwards
La Liga players
Segunda División players
Segunda División B players
Tercera División players
Segunda Federación players
RCD Espanyol B footballers
Atlético Onubense players
Recreativo de Huelva players
Real Betis players
CD Leganés players
UD Almería players
Getafe CF footballers
CD Lugo players
Extremadura UD footballers
Hércules CF players
Lleida Esportiu footballers
Spain youth international footballers